Yeah So is the debut album by British folk-duo Slow Club, released on 6 July 2009.

On 19 April 2010 a vinyl edition of Yeah So was released by Moshi Moshi Records to celebrate Record Store Day

Track listing

References

2009 albums
Slow Club albums
Moshi Moshi Records albums